Philippe Bouvard (born 6 December 1929 in Coulommiers) is a French television and radio presenter. From 1977 to 2014 he hosted the French radio program Les Grosses Têtes on Radio Luxemburg RTL, from 1982 to 1986 he hosted the television program Le Petit Théâtre de Bouvard, and since 2014 he has hosted the radio program Allo Bouvard on RTL.

Honours 
2014 : Commander in the  Order of the Crown.

Filmography
 Vacances explosives (1957) .... François Morel
 The Dirty Game (1965, dialogues)
 A Slightly Pregnant Man (1973) .... Himself
 L'aile ou la cuisse (1976) .... himself as TV presenter

Books
Un homme libre, 1995

References

External links
 

1929 births
Living people
People from Coulommiers
French radio presenters
French television presenters
20th-century French non-fiction writers
20th-century French male writers
21st-century French non-fiction writers
Chevaliers of the Légion d'honneur
Knights of the Ordre national du Mérite
Chevaliers of the Ordre des Arts et des Lettres
École supérieure de journalisme de Paris alumni